Sam, Burkina Faso is a town in the Bourzanga Department of Bam Province in northern Burkina Faso. It has a population of 2,060.

References

External links
Satellite map at Maplandia.com

Populated places in the Centre-Nord Region
Bam Province